The Samoyedic or Samoyed languages are spoken around the Ural Mountains, in northernmost Eurasia, by approximately 25,000 people altogether. They derive from a common ancestral language called Proto-Samoyedic, and form a branch of the Uralic languages. Having separated perhaps in the last centuries BC, they are not a diverse group of languages, and are traditionally considered to be an outgroup, branching off first from the other Uralic languages.

Etymology 

The term Samoyedic is derived from the Russian term samoyed for some indigenous peoples of Siberia. The term has come to be considered derogatory because it has been interpreted by some ethnologists as originating from Russian samo-yed meaning 'self-eater', i.e. 'cannibal'.

An earlier ethnologist had rejected this etymology, and instead traced the term's origin to the expression saam-edne, meaning the Land of the Sami peoples.

The word Samodeic has been proposed as an alternative by some ethnologists.

Classification
Traditionally, Samoyedic languages and peoples have been divided into two major areal groups: Northern Samoyedic (Nenets, Yurats, Enets, Nganasans), and Southern Samoyedic (Selkups) with a further subgroup of Sayan-Samoyedics (Kamasins, Mators) named after the Sayan Mountains. They are however purely geographical, and do not reflect linguistic relations.

Linguistic genealogical classifications point to an early divergence of Nganasan and (perhaps to a lesser degree) Mator, with Enets–Nenets–Yurats and Kamas–Selkup forming internal branches.

 Nganasan (Tavgi or Tawgi-Samoyed)
 Avam
 Vadey/Vadeyev
 Core-Samoyedic
 Enets-Nenets
 Enets (Yenisei-Samoyed)
 Tundra Enets
 Forest Enets
 Yurats †
 Nenets (Yurak-Samoyed)
 Tundra Nenets
 Forest Nenets
 Kamas-Selkup
 Selkup (Ostyak-Samoyed)
 Northern Selkup (Taz)
 Central Selkup (Tym)
 Southern Selkup (Ket)
 Kamassian (Sayan-Samoyed) †
 Kamas
 Koibal
 Mator (Sayan-Samoyed) †
 Taigi
 Karagass
 Soyot

Grammar 
Samoyedic languages are primarily agglutinative. They have postpositions and suffixes and do not use articles or prefixes. Samoyedic languages also have grammatical evidentiality. Word order in Samoyedic languages is typically subject-object-verb (SOV). Below are two sentences in Nenets that demonstrate SOV word order and case in Samoyedic languages:

Nouns 
Nouns in Samoyedic languages do not have gender, but they are declined for number (singular, dual, and plural) as well as case. All Samoyedic languages have at least seven noun cases which may include nominative, genitive, dative, accusative, ablative, locative, instrumental, lative, and/or prolative depending on the language.

Verbs 
Many Samoyedic languages have the following three conjugation types: subjective, objective (in which the number of the object is expressed in addition to that of the subject), and reflexive. Verbs in Samoyedic languages have several moods, ranging from at least eight in Selkup to at least sixteen in Nenets. Other forms of verbs that can be found in Samoyedic languages are gerunds, participles, and infinitives. Of the Samoyedic languages, only Selkup has verbal aspect.

Phonology 
Sonorant-obstruent consonant clusters with two consonants, of which the latter consonant is more sonorous than the former, are the most frequently occurring consonant clusters in several Samoyedic languages. Conversely, consonant clusters ending in glides are not found in any Samoyedic languages.

Unlike some other Uralic languages, Samoyedic languages do not have vowel harmony.

Vowel epenthesis is frequently used in Samoyedic languages to break up consonant clusters, particularly in the case of loanwords borrowed from Russian.

Vowel epenthesis from Russian to Nenets
 крупа (krupa)    >    xurupa   "cereals"
 класс (klass)     >    xalas      "class"
Vowel epenthesis from Russian to Nganasan
 бригада (brigada)    >    birigadә    "brigade"
 метр (metr)              >    metәrә      "meter"
Vowel epenthesis from Russian to Selkup
 стекло (stʲeklo)    >    tʲekɨla    "glass"
 стол (stol)            >    istol       "table"

Contact with Russian language

Impact 
Samoyedic languages have experienced significant language contact with Russian to such an extent that members of the Nenets, Selkup, Nganasan, and Enets ethnic groups now often have Russian as a first language, with speakers of Samoyedic languages primarily belonging to elder age groups.

Loanwords 
Russian loanwords in Samoyedic languages include:

 колхоз ("collective farm")
 машина ("car")
 молоко ("milk")
 Москва ("Moscow")

Geographical distribution 
At present, Samoyed territory extends from the White Sea to the Laptev Sea, along the Arctic shores of European Russia, including southern Novaya Zemlya, the Yamal Peninsula, the mouths of the Ob and the Yenisei, and into the Taimyr peninsula in northernmost Siberia. They are contiguous with the trans-Ural Ugric speakers and the cis-Ural Komi to the south, but they are cut off from the Baltic Finns by the Russians in the west. To the east traditionally dwell the northern Turkic Sakha. A substantial Samoyed city grew up at Mangazeya in the 16th century as a trade city, but was destroyed at the beginning of the 17th century.

The Southern Samoyedic languages, of which only the Selkup language has survived to the present day, historically ranged across a wide territory in central Siberia, extending from the basin of the Ob River in the west to the Sayan-Baikal uplands in the east. Records up to the 18th century sporadically report several further entities such as "Abakan", "Kagmasin", "Soyot", though there is no clear evidence for any of these constituting separate languages, and all available data appears to be explainable as these having been simply early forms of Kamassian or Mator.

References

External links 

 
Languages of Russia